Rubicam is a surname of German origin, meaning "dweller in a turnip field". Notable people with the surname include:

Raymond Rubicam (1892-1978), American advertising pioneer
Shannon Rubicam (born 1951), American singer-songwriter

Surnames of German origin